Bertha Puga Martínez was born on 13 March, 1909 in Tumeco, Araucania, Chile.  She was the wife of the 20th President of Colombia, Alberto Lleras Camargo, and served as First Lady of Colombia from 1958 to 1962. She was also the daughter of Arturo Puga Osorio, Chairman of the Government Junta of Chile in 1932. She died on 9 August, 2007 in Bogota, D.C, Colombia.

Personal life
She moved to Colombia with her family when her father was named Ambassador of Chile to Colombia, and it was then that she met her future husband Alberto Lleras Camargo, whom she married on 10 August 1931. Alberto and Bertha had four children: Consuelo, Alberto, Ximena, and Marcela. Bertha died on 9 August 2007 at the age of 98.

See also
 Carolina Isakson Proctor

References

1909 births
2007 deaths
People from Temuco
Chilean women
Chilean emigrants to Colombia
Naturalized citizens of Colombia
Colombian people of Chilean descent
First ladies of Colombia